Kenneth Herman Rollins (September 14, 1923 – October 9, 2012) was an American professional basketball player. He competed at the 1948 London Olympics and was a member of the University of Kentucky's "Fabulous Five" who won the 1948 NCAA tournament.  His college career was interrupted by service in the United States Navy during World War II. He was voted to the All-SEC and All-SEC Tourney teams following his junior and senior seasons.

His brother, Phil, played for the University of Louisville and spent 3 seasons in the NBA.

Biography

Born in Charleston, Missouri, Rollins played high school basketball in Wickliffe, Kentucky. He later played professionally for the Chicago Stags of the BAA and the NBA, the Louisville Alumnites of the National Professional Basketball League and the Boston Celtics of the NBA.  He died in October 2012 in Greencastle, Indiana where he had lived with his son since 2004.

BAA/NBA career statistics

Regular season

Playoffs

References

External links

 
Profile on Univ Kentucky fan site
Olympic Profile

1923 births
2012 deaths
American men's basketball players
Basketball players at the 1948 Summer Olympics
Basketball players from Missouri
Boston Celtics players
Chicago Stags players
Fort Wayne Pistons draft picks
Kentucky Wildcats men's basketball players
Medalists at the 1948 Summer Olympics
Olympic gold medalists for the United States in basketball
People from Charleston, Missouri
People from Greencastle, Indiana
Point guards
United States men's national basketball team players
United States Navy personnel of World War II